Jia Ling, whose full name is Jia Yuling, is a Chinese xiangsheng performer, comedian and actress who rose to fame after appearing at the 2010 Spring Festival Gala. She was born in Xiangyang, Hubei Province. She founded the company called Big Bowl Entertainment  in 2016 with Sun Jibin (孙集斌) and Li Kun (栗坤).

Early experiences
Jia Ling was born in a family of four in Dashan, Hubei Province, from a poor family. In 1994, she studied acting for two years in Wuhan Art School. In 2000, she applied for the acting major of the Central Academy of Drama and was finally successful. In 2001, she applied for the Drama Performance and Cross Talk Performance of the Central Academy of Drama at the same time. Although both majors were admitted, due to the mistaken selection of her mother Li Huanying, Jia Ling finally could only enroll in the college class of cross talk performance.

After graduation, Jia Ling was unable to receive cross talk performance work because of her female status, so she began to work everywhere, making a living by working as a part-time host, script creator, temporary assistant to the artist, and the assistance of her sister Jia Dan. In 2005, she was admitted to the China Broadcasting Art Troupe and became a student under Feng Gong.

Biography
Jia was born Jia Yuling in 1982 in Xiangyang, Hubei. After graduating from the Central Academy of Drama in 2003 where she studied Xiangsheng performance, she worked with crosstalk performer Feng Gong appearing a series of short sketches. In the same year she participated in China's National Comic sketch Tournament winning first place.

In 2010 she made her television debut during the 2010 CCTV New Year's Gala where she appeared in a segment called Gala Talk which was later voted the third favourite performance of the night. 

She is one of the main guests invited by the TV show Your Face Sounds Familiar (Chinese version) S1 at Hunan TV in 2012, and continues to be one of the main guests for the next three seasons. 

In 2014, she is one of the MC of the TV show Lok Street which is about improv comedy. 

In 2015, she performed her sketch called Lok Street during the 2015 CCTV New Year's Gala. 

Later in 2015, she performed a controversial comedy sketch of Hua Mulan where the sketch portrayed Mulan to be a silly food-hungry and gluttonous girl that was duped into joining the army. An institute called Mulan Cultural Research Centre asked her to apologize. But a lot of Chinese netizens also support her and believe that her performance should be acceptable. The authority and reliability of the Mulan Cultural Research Centre are still controversial, and many people asked for enhancing the regulation of this kind of institutes.

In 2016, she and her team took part in a TV show of comedy competition called Comedy General Mobilization S1; her sketch "Hello, Li Huanying" was played in the first episode in the show, and won the first place in the episode.  

In 2017, her company is the co-producer of the TV show Happy Theater which is about improv comedy.  She also took part in the TV show Comedy General Mobilization S2 in the same year and became one of the team leaders. 

From 2018 to 2020, she is one of the MC of the TV show Ace VS Ace at Zhejiang TV.

In 2020, she is an MC of the TV show Youth Periplous 2 at Zhejiang TV. 

In 2020, she ranked 93rd on Forbes China Celebrity 100 list.

In 2021, her directorial debut Hi, Mom, which was adapted from her 2016 sketch comedy of the same name, was released during the Chinese Spring Festival. She made this film in memory of her mother.

Film and television works

Drama

Legend of the White Snake, new
Proposal Story
Talking about Shanghai Beach
Later in the future
Omnipotent performance
Open Sesame

Sketch

Lok Street (2015)
Comedy!Comedy (2015)
A Smiling girl (2015)
A Chinese Ghost Story（skit) (2015)
Wronged Memory (2015)
Heavenly Sword Dragon Slaying Saber (skit) (2015)
A Chinese Odyssey (Skit) (2015)
Hi, Mom (Li Huan Ying) (2016)
Jiu Er (2016)

Movies

TV Drama

Variety Show
Your Face Sounds Familiar (Chinese version) (2012-2014)
Let's Laugh Together (2014)
Star Chef S1 (2014)
Lok Street S1 (2014)
Lok Street S2 (2015)
Real Hero (2015)
Run For Time (2015)
Comedy Class of Spring S1 (2015)
Top Funny Comedian S1 (2015)
Running Man (China) S4 (22 April 2016)
Happy Camp (21 May 2016, 28 May 2016)
Star Chefs arriving S3 (2016)
Comedy General Mobilization (2016)
Top Funny Comedian S2 (2016)
Comedy Class of Spring S2 (2017)
Running Man (China) S5 (12 May 2017, 19 May 2017)
 Ace VS Ace S2 (7 April 2017)
Ace VS Ace S3 (2018)
Ace VS Ace S4 (2019)
Ace VS Ace S5 (2020)
Youth Periplous 2 (2020）
Ace VS Ace S6 (2021)
Your Face Sounds Familiar (Chinese version) (2021)

References

External links
 

1982 births
Living people
Central Academy of Drama alumni
Chinese xiangsheng performers
Chinese women comedians
Actresses from Hubei
People from Xiangyang